Henrique Zech Coelho Van Randow known as Henrique (born April 5, 1978) is a former Brazilian volleyball player.

He competed at the 2002 FIVB Men's Volleyball World Championship where Brazil claimed their first championship.

External links
Player bio at 2012 FIVB Volleyball World League website

1978 births
Living people
Brazilian men's volleyball players
Sportspeople from Belo Horizonte
21st-century Brazilian people